"Still on It" was the first and only single from American singer Ashanti's remix album Collectables by Ashanti. The single was released in late November 2005 and there are three versions: one featuring rappers Paul Wall and Method Man, and two remixes featuring T.I. and labelmate Caddillac Tah, respectively. The single generated less interest than previous Ashanti singles, reaching number 15 on the "Bubbling Under" portion of the Billboard Hot 100.

The track samples "Knowledge Me" by Original Concept, which was also sampled by Masta Ace for the track "Born to Roll". AllMusic called the song "ruggedly sweet."

Formats and track listings
These are the formats and track listings of promo single-releases of "Still On It".
"Still On It" (Main) (Featuring Method Man and Paul Wall)
"Still On It" (Instrumental)
"Still Down (Remix)" (Main) (Featuring T.I.)
"Still On It" (A Cappella) (Featuring Method Man and Paul Wall)
"Still Down (Remix)" (Clean) (Featuring Cadillac Tah)
"Still Down (Remix)" (Main) (Featuring Cadillac Tah)
"Still Down (Remix)" (Instrumental)

Charts

References

2005 singles
Ashanti (singer) songs
Paul Wall songs
Method Man songs
Songs written by Ashanti (singer)
Songs written by Irv Gotti
Songs written by Method Man
Songs written by Paul Wall